The Tenja concentration camp was one of 26 concentration camps established in the Independent State of Croatia during World War II. It was located close to village of Tenja near Osijek and operated by Ustaše.

Establishment 
Similar to Terezin camp, the Tenja camp was not a concentration camp in its ordinary meaning of the word because it was planned to become a small settlement inhabited and governed by Jews. The decision to establish this concentration camp was made in January 1942 by Grand Župan of Baranja, Stjepan Heffer, the military and police headquarters of Baranja and city government who all planned deportation of Osijek Jews to Tenja as the final solution of Jewish question in Osijek and its surroundings. 

The building of the settlement was completed in April 1942 with funds collected by Jewish municipality of Osijek Jewish Community. The camp included a building of the former envelope factory Mursa Mill used to accommodate very old and ill inmates.

Disestablishment 
Around 3,000 Jewish inmates were deported from Tenja to Auschwitz and Jasenovac. The first departure of 1,700 inmates was organized on 14 August 1942, second on 18 August and remaining inmates were deported at the end of August, some of them first to Lobor concentration camp and then to Auschwitz.

References

Sources

Further reading 
 Zlata Živaković-Kerže, (Hrvatski institut za povijest – Podružnica za povijest Slavonije, Srijema i Baranje, Slavonski Brod) OD ŽIDOVSKOG NASELJA U TENJI DO SABIRNOG LOGORA

Concentration camps of the Independent State of Croatia
Ustaše
History of Slavonia